Murtaza Sidiqi is an Irish cricketer. He made his Twenty20 debut for Munster Reds in the 2018 Inter-Provincial Trophy on 18 May 2018.

References

External links
 

Year of birth missing (living people)
Living people
Irish cricketers
Munster Reds cricketers
Place of birth missing (living people)
Irish people of Afghan descent